Duripelta is a genus of Polynesian araneomorph spiders in the family Orsolobidae, and was first described by Raymond Robert Forster in 1956.

Species
 it contains seventeen species, found only in New Zealand:
Duripelta alta Forster & Platnick, 1985 – New Zealand
Duripelta australis Forster, 1956 – New Zealand
Duripelta borealis Forster, 1956 (type) – New Zealand
Duripelta egmont Forster & Platnick, 1985 – New Zealand
Duripelta hunua Forster & Platnick, 1985 – New Zealand
Duripelta koomaa Forster & Platnick, 1985 – New Zealand
Duripelta mawhero Forster & Platnick, 1985 – New Zealand
Duripelta minuta Forster, 1956 – New Zealand
Duripelta monowai Forster & Platnick, 1985 – New Zealand
Duripelta otara Forster & Platnick, 1985 – New Zealand
Duripelta pallida (Forster, 1956) – New Zealand
Duripelta paringa Forster & Platnick, 1985 – New Zealand
Duripelta peha Forster & Platnick, 1985 – New Zealand
Duripelta scuta Forster & Platnick, 1985 – New Zealand
Duripelta totara Forster & Platnick, 1985 – New Zealand
Duripelta townsendi Forster & Platnick, 1985 – New Zealand
Duripelta watti Forster & Platnick, 1985 – New Zealand

See also
 List of Orsolobidae species

References

Araneomorphae genera
Orsolobidae
Spiders of New Zealand
Taxa named by Raymond Robert Forster
Endemic spiders of New Zealand